Major-General Sir Philip Rynd Robertson  (5 April 1866 – 11 May 1936) was a British Army officer of the late nineteenth and early twentieth centuries, who commanded a battalion, a brigade and then division in the First World War.

Early career and family
Philip Rynd Robertson was born on 5 April 1866, the eldest surviving son of General J.H.C. Robertson. He was educated at Charterhouse School before entering the Royal Military College, Sandhurst. He passed out of Sandhurst in 1886, and was commissioned as a lieutenant in the Cameronians (Scottish Rifles) on 25 August.

He remained with his regiment for thirteen years, with a promotion to Captain in 1896, until he was appointed as the adjutant to a volunteer battalion in India in February 1899. While in India, in 1897, he married Margaret Elizabeth Beresford, the daughter of John Stuart Beresford, chief engineer of the Punjab government. He returned to regimental duties in January 1904, having remained in India throughout the Boer War, and was promoted to Major in September. In October 1913, he was promoted to Lieutenant-Colonel and appointed to command the 1st Battalion of the Cameronians.

First World War
On the outbreak of the First World War in August 1914, the 1st Cameronians were one of four independent battalions earmarked for service with the British Expeditionary Force as line of communications troops. They landed in France on 11 August, and on 22 August all four were grouped into the 19th Infantry Brigade for frontline service. Under Robertson's command, the battalion first saw action on 23 August at the Battle of Mons, where the 19th Brigade held the far left of the British line, It served in reserve during the Battle of Le Cateau, covering the retreat of the 5th Division at the end of the day's fighting.

The battalion returned to the front in October, where it repulsed several heavy attacks, and remained in line during the winter of 1914–15, under the command of 6th Division. When the 6th Division was relieved by the 27th Division in late May 1915, the 19th Brigade remained in place and was transferred to the new division; shortly afterwards, on 15 June, Robertson was promoted to command the brigade, with the temporary rank of Brigadier-General. He succeeded the Hon. Frederick Gordon, who had been promoted to command the 22nd Division. In August, the brigade was again transferred, to the 2nd Division, and under this new command it took part in the Battle of Loos in September.

At Loos, the brigade was under orders to attack behind a barrage of chlorine gas on 25 September, but early on the morning of the attack the wind changed. Robertson applied for permission to cancel the gas attack, but was refused, and it was released according to schedule; as a result, it lay in clouds along the trench line, some drifting back into the British positions. The subsequent attack was almost completely unsuccessful, at the cost of heavy casualties. A second assault on the 27th was ordered, but Robertson gave instructions that the infantry attack was to be held back until the gas could be seen to have effect; the gas failed a second time, and the attack was cancelled. The brigade did not see heavy action through the remainder of the battle, spending most of October in reserve, and in late November was transferred to the newly arrived 33rd Division. The following winter was mostly quiet, with occasional shelling and raids; on 2 January, the Brigade HQ was bombarded with some casualties, though Robertson appears to have been uninjured, and in early April, a battalion history notes that "the Brigadier's barber [was] wounded while he was cutting the Brigadier's hair" at HQ. In the spring, raiding resumed again, and in May the brigade took up a larger section of the line in order to free troops for the Somme offensive. On 22 June, the largest mine constructed by the Germans on the Western Front was detonated in this sector, with heavy casualties, and a retaliatory raid followed on 5 July; two days later, the division was ordered south to take part in the Battle of the Somme, which had begun on 1 July. Before it moved into the line, Robertson relinquished command of 19th Brigade; on 13 July he was promoted to take over 17th (Northern) Division, succeeding Thomas Pilcher. From June 1919 to June 1923 he commanded the 52nd (Lowland) Infantry Division, Territorial Army, his last post.

Later career and retirement
Robertson retired to Bideford: There is a plaque to him within St Mary's church there.

Notes

References
"ROBERTSON, Maj.-Gen. Sir Philip Rynd". (2007). In Who Was Who. Online edition

|-

1866 births
1936 deaths
British Army generals of World War I
Cameronians officers
British Army major generals
People educated at Charterhouse School
Knights Commander of the Order of the Bath
Companions of the Order of St Michael and St George
Graduates of the Royal Military College, Sandhurst